Rozan may refer to
Rozan (surname)
Rozan (owarai), a Japanese comedy duo
Gmina Różan, administrative district in Poland
Różan, administrative center of Gmina Różan 
Battle of Różan between Poland and Germany in 1939
Różan Land, a former administrative district in Poland

See also